ONE on Prime Video refers to ONE Championship events broadcast live on Amazon Prime during prime time hours in the United States and Canada.

Background
The debut event of the series featured the ONE Flyweight World Championship rematch between current three-time champion Adriano Moraes and former UFC Flyweight Champion (also 2019 ONE Flyweight World Grand Prix Champion) Demetrious Johnson. The pair previously fought at ONE on TNT 1 in April 2021 where Moraes defeated Johnson by KO in Round 2. A ONE Bantamweight Muay Thai World Championship bout between current champion Nong-O Gaiyanghadao and Liam Harrison was the co-main event at the show.

The event was to feature a semi-final of the ONE Flyweight Muay Thai World Grand Prix between current ONE Flyweight Muay Thai World Champion Rodtang Jitmuangnon and Savvas Michael with the winner advancing to the World Grand Prix final. However, Rodtang was forced to withdraw due to failed to provide a sample for the organization’s mandatory hydration test and was not permitted to weigh in and was replaced by Panpayak Jitmuangnon who scheduled against Sherzod Kabutov in preliminary card.

A Flyweight Muay Thai bout between former ONE Flyweight Muay Thai World Champion Jonathan Haggerty and Amir Naseri was expected to take place at the event. However, Haggerty forced to withdraw from the contest due to a non-COVID related illness and the bout was cancelled.

At the weigh-ins, two fighters missed weight for their respective bouts. Itsuki Hirata weighed in at 119.25 pounds, 4.25 lbs over the Atomweight non-title fight limit. Zebaztian Kadestam weighed in at 188.5 pounds, 3.5 lbs over the welterweight non-title fight limit. Both bouts proceeded at catchweight. Kadestam was fined 30% of their purse, which went to their opponent Iuri Lapicus; Hirata was fined 50% of their purse, which went to their opponent Lin Heqin.

Results

Bonus awards 
The following fighters received $50,000 bonuses.

Performance of the Night: Demetrious Johnson, Nong-O Gaiyanghadao, Panpayak Jitmuangnon, Marcus Almeida and Superlek Kiatmuu9

See also 

 2022 in ONE Championship
 List of ONE Championship events
 List of current ONE fighters

References 

Events in Singapore
ONE Championship events
2022 in mixed martial arts
Mixed martial arts in Singapore
Sports competitions in Singapore
August 2022 sports events in Singapore